Erdem Seçgin (born 5 January 2000) is a Turkish professional footballer who plays as a midfielder for TFF Second League club Isparta 32 Spor on loan from İstanbulspor.

Professional career
On 29 January 2018, Seçgin signed his first professional contract with Beşiktaş J.K.for 2.5 years. He made his professional debut for Beşiktaş in a 3–2 Europe League win over Sarpsborg 08 FF on 29 November 2018.

References

External links
 
 
 
 

2000 births
People from Bağcılar
Footballers from Istanbul
Living people
Turkish footballers
Turkey youth international footballers
Association football midfielders
Beşiktaş J.K. footballers
Ümraniyespor footballers
İnegölspor footballers
İstanbulspor footballers
TFF First League players
TFF Second League players